Maria Alessandra Gallone (born 2 September 1966) is an Italian politician.
Senator Gallone concluded her first mandate in 2013, a second mandate started in 2018. Senator worked strictly with mayor of Bergamo between 1999 and 2004. She also served on the city council for 20 years.

References 

Living people
1966 births
Forza Italia politicians
21st-century Italian politicians
21st-century Italian women politicians
Senators of Legislature XVI of Italy
Senators of Legislature XVII of Italy
Senators of Legislature XVIII of Italy
People from Bergamo
Forza Italia (2013) senators
20th-century Italian women
Women members of the Senate of the Republic (Italy)